Loving is a 2016 historical drama film written and directed by Jeff Nichols. The film tells the story of Richard and Mildred Loving, the plaintiffs in the 1967 U.S. Supreme Court decision Loving v. Virginia, which invalidated state laws prohibiting interracial marriage. The film stars Joel Edgerton as Richard Loving, with Ruth Negga co-starring as Mildred Loving. Marton Csokas, Nick Kroll, and Michael Shannon are all featured in supporting roles. The film takes inspiration from The Loving Story (2011) by Nancy Buirski, a documentary which follows the Lovings and their landmark case.

Prior to Loving's successful screenings at the Toronto International Film Festival and Hamptons International Film Festival, the film had premiered at the Cannes Film Festival, on May 16, 2016 in Cannes, France, where it had been selected to compete for the Palme d'Or. Focus Features initially gave the film a limited release in the United States on November 4, 2016, in four locations in New York City and Los Angeles, including ArcLight Hollywood and The Landmark. The film was later given a wide release at 46 theaters in the United States on November 11. Film review aggregator Rotten Tomatoes reports that 89% of critics gave the film a "Certified Fresh" rating, based on 178 reviews with an average score of 7.7/10. Metacritic, another review aggregator, assigned the film a weighted average score of 79 (out of 100) based on 45 reviews from mainstream critics, considered to be "generally favorable".

Loving garnered awards and nominations in a variety of categories with particular praise for its acting (for Joel Edgerton and Ruth Negga), Jeff Nichols' direction, the elegance of Nichols' screenplay, and its faithfulness to the Loving's account.

Accolades

See also
2016 in film

Notes

References

External links
 

Lists of accolades by film